Ashtin Berry is an American hospitality activist, sommelier, mixologist and founder of Radical Xchange, a community that comes together and consults about intersectionality through workshops. Ashtin received a Roku Industry Icon award at The World's Best 50 Best Bars for opening the bar world to new aspects.

Early life 
Ashtin Berry is originally from Chicago, Illinois. She grew up in a household of activism. With a mother who was a sexual educator and very involved in the community. Berry began working in hospitality at age 15. She said that black people were the backbone of the hospitality industry. Berry soon followed in her mother's footsteps in being active in communities such as  bartending and hospitality. She graduated from University of Chicago with a Sociology degree.

Career 
Berry's career started in bars in Chicago and they were mostly sport bars. After figuring out that the corporate life wasn't for her, she started a one year stint in NYC. While being in New York City, she worked as a beverage manager, a sommelier, and beverage director at Air's Champagne Parlor and Tokyo Record Bar. In a 2018, article called '2019 Bartender of the Year: Ashtin Berry' by Imbibe magazine. Berry said, “If we shifted the way we communicate and engage with guests, and if we lead our employees differently, we can change so much about society.” Berry has worked to persuade employers to have employees train from a supportive and intersectional standpoint in order to make hospitality better.

Throughout the years, Berry became more involved in changing the inequalities in the world of hospitality. She founded a non-governmental and non-profit organization called Radical Xchange in 2018.  With opening Radical Xchange, there was a vision of gathering people in the hospitality industry and others to rejoice and acknowledge the work black and African American people have done in the hospitality industry. She had discussions about race, gender, sexual harassment and other political topics. With that New Orleans becomes her home. She says that with a city population with 60 percent of Black people, they are struggling to see Black sous chefs and bartenders.

Beliefs 
Berry has worked to prioritize intersectionality and diversity in the hospitality industry, and to promote a healthy employee culture.

References

External links 
 Radical XChange